A bevor or beaver is a piece of plate armour designed to protect the neck, much like a gorget.

Etymology
The word “bevor” or “beaver” is derived from Old French baver, meaning ‘to dribble’. This is a reference to the effect on the wearer of the armour during battle.

Description

The bevor was a component of a medieval suit of armour. It was usually a single piece of plate armour protecting the chin and throat and filling the gap between the helmet and breastplate. The bevor could also extend over the knight’s left shoulder doubling the thickness of the armour. 

The bevor was originally worn in conjunction with a type of helmet known as a sallet. With the close helm and burgonet, developments of the sallet in the late medieval and Renaissance period, the bevor became a hinged plate protecting the lower face and throat. In the 16th century, the bevor developed into the falling buffe. This was a composite piece made up of several lames protecting the lower face and throat, but which could be raised or lowered as the lames were articulated.

References

External links 

 The bevor's description on myarmoury.com
 The Art of Chivalry : European arms and armor from the Metropolitan Museum of Art : an exhibition, Issued in connection with an exhibition in 1982 at The Metropolitan Museum of Art 

Medieval armour
Western plate armour